In physics, general covariant transformations are symmetries of  gravitation theory on a world manifold . From the physical viewpoint, general covariant transformations are treated as particular (holonomic) reference frame transformations in general relativity. In mathematics, general covariant transformations are defined as particular automorphisms of so-called natural fiber bundles.

Mathematical definition 
Let  be a fibered manifold with local fibered coordinates . However, the converse is not true.

  

There is a problem of constructing its lift to a projectable vector field on  projected onto . Such a lift always exists, but it need not be canonical.

 

However, there is a category of above mentioned natural bundles  which admit the functorial lift  onto  of any vector field  on  such that  is a Lie algebra monomorphism

 

Natural bundles are exemplified by tensor bundles.

 

A frame bundle  of linear tangent frames in  also is a natural bundle. All bundles associated with a frame bundle are natural.

See also
 General covariance
 Gauge gravitation theory
 Fibered manifold

References
 Kolář, I., Michor, P., Slovák, J., Natural operations in differential geometry.  Springer-Verlag: Berlin Heidelberg, 1993.  , .
 Sardanashvily, G., Advanced Differential Geometry for Theoreticians. Fiber bundles, jet manifolds and Lagrangian theory, Lambert Academic Publishing: Saarbrücken, 2013. ; 
 

Differential geometry
Manifolds
Fiber bundles
Gravity
Gauge theories